Treig E. Pronschinske (born July 7, 1978) is an American businessman and Republican politician from Buffalo County, Wisconsin.  He is a member of the Wisconsin State Assembly, representing the 92nd Assembly district since 2017.

Biography

From Eau Claire, Wisconsin, Pronschinske graduated from Memorial High School. He then received his degree in construction management from Chippewa Valley Technical College. He owns a construction company in Mondovi, Wisconsin. Treig is ambidextrous. A Republican, since 2017 Pronschinske has served in the Wisconsin State Assembly, representing District 92.

Sex Discrimination Lawsuit 
In 2017, Pronschinske was named in a sex discrimination lawsuit, along with the city of Mondovi and former police chief Scott Smith. The suit was settled in 2019, with the city of Mondovi paying $325,000 in the settlement.

Questions on public health 
In 2022, Pronschinske questioned whether any public health measure might stop the spread of a virus, since viruses cannot be seen by the naked eye.

Notes

Living people
People from Mondovi, Wisconsin
Politicians from Eau Claire, Wisconsin
Chippewa Valley Technical College alumni
Businesspeople from Wisconsin
Republican Party members of the Wisconsin State Assembly
1978 births
21st-century American politicians